Linda and Terry Jamison (born January 12, 1955) are American identical twins based in Los Angeles, California who claim to be psychics. The Jamisons' predictions have been featured in tabloid newspapers, and they have appeared in various media. They claim to have channeled the spirits of dead celebrities and predicted future events such as the September 11 attacks, however critics question the accuracy of their predictions, as well as the reality of their claimed supernatural powers.

Education and background 
The Jamisons grew up in West Chester, Pennsylvania. Their parents, Jane and Philip Jamison, were writers and painters. The Jamisons attended Temple University, and later worked as painters and performance artists.

Career as "The Psychic Twins" 
After leaving West Chester, the twins moved to Los Angeles and refocused their career as psychics, calling themselves "The Psychic Twins", reportedly charging more than $500 per person for psychic readings. According to the Jamisons, they have predicted the future and contacted spirits of the dead, such as Lady Diana, Natalie Wood and Michael Jackson.

The Jamisons predictions have often been featured in tabloid newspapers such as The Sun, and according to the Jamisons, they have made numerous appearances in print, television, and on stage with "major stars".

The Jamison twins maintain a YouTube channel on which YouTube stars Trisha Paytas and Shane Dawson have appeared.

Critical analysis 
The Jamisons widely claim to have predicted the September 11 attacks on the World Trade Center during a November 2, 1999 interview on the Art Bell radio show. However, according to show transcripts, their actual statement was: 
"We are seeing terrorist attacks on Federal Government, excuse me, federal buildings. Particularly South Carolina or Georgia, by July 2002 and also the New York Trade Center, the World Trade Center in 2002." The September 11 attack occurred in 2001, not 2002, and it was common knowledge that the buildings had been previously attacked by terrorists in the 1993 World Trade Center bombing, calling into question the Jamisons' claims.

Leon Jaroff, in Time, pointed out that the Jamison twins incorrectly predicted that Saddam Hussein would be killed by U.S. troops in early 2004, and that Pope John Paul II would die in June 2004 (he actually died in April 2005).

In September 2019, scientific skeptic Thomas Westbrook released a video dissecting the Twins's claims, including their most repeated claim of having predicted the September 11 attacks, and concluded that the twins demonstrate no paranormal abilities.

Books

References

External links
 
 

Jamison
Jamison
Jamison, Linda
Jamison
Jamison
Jamison
Jamison
Jamison
American YouTubers